Robert John Walker (14 January 1900 – 19 May 1971) was an Australian rules footballer who played with Fitzroy in the Victorian Football League (VFL).

Notes

External links 

1900 births
1971 deaths
Australian rules footballers from Victoria (Australia)
Fitzroy Football Club players